William J. Binder is an American facial plastic and reconstructive surgeon. He is best known for his 1992 discovery of the use of Botox to alleviate chronic migraine. In 2010, FDA approved the use of Botox as a treatment to migraine.

Biography
Binder holds an M.D. degree from University of Medicine and Dentistry of New Jersey. He was elected as a member of the Board of Directors of the American Board of Facial Plastic and Reconstructive Surgery, where he also serves as a National Board Examiner. 

He is a member of the National Review Committee for the American Academy of Neurology Therapeutics and Technologies Subcommittee on the Assessment of Botulinum Toxin Therapy and also an adjunct reviewer for the Archives of Facial Plastic Surgery Journal.

Binder is board certified by both the American Board of Facial Plastic and Reconstructive Surgery, and the American Board of Otolaryngology and Head and Neck Surgery. He published around 70 articles on national medical and surgical journals. He edited three textbooks in Facial Plastic Surgery and Head and Neck Surgery and Otolaryngology. 

He speaks and lecturers on various aspects of facial plastic surgery, including Rhinoplasty and multi-level concept of face lift surgery. 

Binder has filed 15 U.S. and European patents in the area of Custom Plastic Surgery Implants, Method for Reduction of Migraine Headache Pain, Flexible support wrap, and Anesthesia conduit. In 1992, Binder discovered the use of Botox to alleviate sufferers of chronic migraine headaches.

He reported in 2000 that patients who had cosmetic injections around the face reported relief from chronic headache. This was initially thought to be an indirect effect of reduced muscle tension, but it is now known that the toxin inhibits release of peripheral nociceptive neurotransmitters, suppressing the central pain processing systems responsible for migraine headache. In 2010, the FDA approved intramuscular botulinum toxin injections for prophylactic treatment of chronic migraine headache.

References

External links 
 

Year of birth missing (living people)
Living people
American plastic surgeons
University of Medicine and Dentistry of New Jersey alumni